Missy Piggle-Wiggle is a series of children's books written by Ann M. Martin and Annie Parnell and published between 2016 and 2018.  The series is a spinoff from the Mrs. Piggle-Wiggle series published beginning in 1947, with Missy Piggle-Wiggle being the great-niece of Mrs. Piggle-Wiggle. Like the original series, Missy Piggle-Wiggle features a main character who cures children's bad habits through the use of magic.

The series is written by Ann M. Martin, best known for The Baby-Sitters Club, and Annie Parnell, the great-granddaughter of the Mrs. Piggle-Wiggle's author, Betty MacDonald. Illustrations are by Ben Hatke. In this series, Mrs. Piggle-Wiggle's husband is alive, but has gone missing, and Mrs. Piggle-Wiggle has set out in search of him, leaving Missy in charge of her house. Missy soon begins helping the children in the neighborhood with her own take on Mrs. Piggle-Wiggle's special magic and cures. The series is set in the modern era, though the nature of the problems and cures remains similar to those in the original works.

The series began with Missy Piggle-Wiggle and the Whatever Cure, published in September 2016, followed by Missy Piggle-Wiggle and the Won't-Walk-the-Dog Cure in September 2017 and Missy Piggle-Wiggle and the Sticky-Fingers Cure in September 2018.

Stories

References 

American children's novels
Series of children's books
Children's fantasy novels